Godaikin or GoDaiKin (a combination of gokin (合金, "alloy") and dai (大, "big"/"great")) was a line of Super Robot toys released by Bandai America from 1982 to 1985, composed of figures from Popy-created series such as Chogokin and Popinika.

History

Mattel had previously tried to market Popy's figures as Shogun Warriors in the late 1970s, before the line was cancelled, partially due to safety concerns. In 1982 Bandai decided to try themselves, and came up with the Godaikin range. The name is presented as "GoDaiKin" on the packaging (however, within collectors' sources, the title case version is more commonly used).

Popy selected ten of their most popular Deluxe (short: DX) Chogokin figures for release in North America for 1982 - these typically varied between 10 and 12 inches in height in robot mode and came in large boxes with carrying handles on the sides. Bandai America had no American facilities for manufacturing the figures, instead shipping the toys from Japan in styrofoam to their New Jersey-located US Headquarters where they were placed inside the new boxes. The toyline's tagline was "An innovative series of super robots". Unlike most toys of the time, the figures did have their wide selection of spring-loaded weapons left intact for the Western releases, which had only mild variations from the Japanese releases; Bandai's decision to aim the toys at an older audience may have been a factor in allowing them to circumvent safety laws.

The large size of the toys, the expense of their construction and the freight costs of shipping them over to America led to the toys being prohibitively expensive for many children (some having a retail price of around US $80), and sales were poor. For the second series of Godaikin figures, Bandai introduced a smaller range of figures alongside the next batch of Deluxes. The Standard Godaikin were all around 6 inches tall, and some were smaller versions of Deluxe figures released the same year. Some of these were actually DX Chogokin due to their features, but were bracketed as standard figures in America due to their size. Bandai also released some toys from the Big Scale Ships range to tie in with the figures.

However, in the face of competition from cheaper lines such as Transformers and Gobots, Godaikin still failed to take off. Unlike these series, Godaikin had no tie-in media to promote it outside of a single promotional comic seen in  1986 catalog, as the robots were drawn from a wide number of diverse anime and tokusatsu series. Some of these had been shown in America previously in different forms, but none were actively tied into the Godaikin brand.

The line would continue with infrequent releases for another couple of years, largely repackaging overstock from Japan, where the Super Robot market was suffering something of a decline. Godaikin figures regularly ended up reduced in an attempt to sell, and large numbers of unsold units were shipped on to Europe and Australia, where they were repackaged once more and sold as part of Bandai's Robo Machine and Machine Men ranges respectively.

While a commercial failure, the line introduced many collectors to high quality Japanese toys, and now good condition examples fetch large amounts on the second-hand market.

Toys

Series 1 (1982–1983)

Golion would later find much greater fame as the star of the cartoon series Voltron: Defender of the Universe. Combattra was the only toy previously released in North America, as part of Shogun Warriors.

Series 2 (1984)

Series 3 (1985–1986) (a.k.a. "Godaikin Forces")

External links
 Godaikin Gallery at Robot-Japan
 Godaikin reviews at CollectionDX
 Godaikin information at Zinc Panic
 Godaikin information and reviews at Counter-X
 Godaikin reviews at Ted Terranova's Robot Page

1980s toys
Bandai brands
Defunct brands
Japanese die-cast toys
Super robot anime and manga
Transforming toy robots